Listed here are the human Y-chromosome DNA haplogroups found in various ethnic groups and populations from North Africa and Sahel (Tuaregs).

By population

By samples from country
Samples over-represent the smaller populations which are usually the subject of genetic studies

Geographic components for Y-DNA lineages

See also 
Africa
Maghrebis
List of ethnic groups of Africa
Languages of Africa
Y-DNA haplogroups by group
Y-DNA haplogroups in populations of the Near East
Y-DNA haplogroups in populations of Europe
Y-DNA haplogroups in populations of the Caucasus
Y-DNA haplogroups in populations of South Asia
Y-DNA haplogroups in populations of East and Southeast Asia
Y-DNA haplogroups in populations of Oceania
Y-DNA haplogroups in populations of Central and North Asia
Y-DNA haplogroups in indigenous peoples of the Americas

Notes

References

External links 
Y-DNA Ethnographic and Genographic Atlas and Open-Source Data Compilation

Africa North